Whaddon may refer to several places in England:
Whaddon, Buckinghamshire
Whaddon, Cambridgeshire
Whaddon, Cheltenham, Gloucestershire
Whaddon, Stroud, in Brookthorpe-with-Whaddon, Gloucestershire
Whaddon, Wiltshire, hamlet near Trowbridge
Whaddon, Salisbury, village near Salisbury, Wiltshire